Bluebelle was a  twin-masted sailing ketch based out of Fort Lauderdale, Florida. The ship was scuttled following an act of mass murder by the ship's captain, Julian Harvey, on November 12, 1961.

Harvey died by suicide on November 17 within hours of receiving news that 11-year-old Terry Jo Duperrault had survived the scuttling. She had been rescued at sea three and a half days after the incident, having drifted upon a small cork dinghy without food, water, or shelter for approximately 82 hours.

Terry Jo's survival led to her becoming known within international media as the "Sea Waif" and the "Sea Orphan".

Background
The final complement of the Bluebelle consisted of 40-year-old Arthur Duperrault, his wife Jean (38) and their three children: Brian (14), Terry Jo (11), and René (7). Duperrault was a successful contact lens optometrist. He and his family resided in Green Bay, Wisconsin, and he had long dreamed of taking his wife and children on a week-long family cruise from the Florida Keys to the Bahamas, which he had sailed during his World War II service, as opposed to the family facing another cold Wisconsin winter. For several years, the Duperraults had saved money for this opulent experience.

By the summer of 1961, the Duperrault family had saved enough money to finance this cruise. The family planned to spend a week living at sea aboard a chartered yacht in a warm climate, docking at several chosen locations, and possibly extending the sabbatical if all enjoyed themselves.

The family arrived in Fort Lauderdale in early November, where they chartered the  ketch the Bluebelle, stationed at the Bahia Mar Marina, for $515. Duperrault hired a well-known local yachtsman, 44-year-old Julian Harvey (with whom he was acquainted), to skipper the vessel for $100 per day. Harvey's sixth wife, 34-year-old former stewardess and aspiring writer Mary Dene Harvey (née Jordan), was also appointed to serve as a cook on the ketch.

Final voyage
The Duperrault family boarded the Bluebelle at around midday on Wednesday, November 8, 1961. The vessel was last seen leaving port early that afternoon.

Over the following four days, the family traveled to locations such as Bimini and Sandy Point, where the Duperraults purchased souvenirs and engaged in activities such as snorkeling. On November 12, at their final port of call prior to returning to Florida, Duperrault, and Captain Harvey visited the office of British district commissioner Roderick Pinder, to whom Duperrault stated: "This has been a once-in-a-lifetime vacation", adding, "We'll be back before Christmas." That evening, all aboard the Bluebelle ate a meal of chicken cacciatore and salad. Shortly thereafter, 11-year-old Terry Jo walked below deck to her sleeping cabin as her family and the Harveys remained on deck.

Initial rescue
At approximately 12:35 p.m. on Monday, November 13, a crew member aboard the oil tanker Gulf Lion observed a man waving frantically from a dinghy drifting in their direction and shouting, "Help! I have a dead baby on board!" Pulling the man aboard, crew members observed the deceased body of a red-haired prepubescent girl wearing a life jacket inside the dinghy.

The man identified himself as Julian Harvey, skipper of the ketch Bluebelle. Harvey explained that at approximately 8:30 the previous evening, his small vessel was hit by a sudden, strong squall that caused the Bluebelle to rapidly keel over and the main mast to snap at a location between the Abaco Islands and Great Stirrup Cay, slightly injuring his wife and Duperrault and piercing the ship's hull. According to Harvey, he was completely separated from all others on board the ketch by this falling mast and the resultant loose rigging, which pulled down the mizzen. He attempted to retrieve a wire cutter from the cabin to clear the deck space, but a sudden fire broke out on board the small vessel, and he was not able to rescue his wife or any of his passengers.

Forced to abandon the ketch alone on a dinghy, the body of seven-year-old René Duperrault had soon floated by, and he had retrieved her body and attempted to revive the child. Unsuccessful in this medical effort, he had kept her body alongside him in the raft out of respect. (An autopsy later revealed the child had died of drowning.)

Harvey's questioning
Taken to Nassau, Harvey was questioned by authorities. Although his calm demeanor and the fact his dinghy had been filled with various survival supplies caused some to initially express serious doubts as to his claims, Harvey's story could not be disproven, and he was allowed to return to Miami on November 15, to face further questioning by the U.S. Coast Guard.

Second rescue
Three days later, on November 16, a child was rescued in the Northwest Providence Channel by the Greek freighter Captain Theo. Second officer Nicolaos Spachidakis observed her floating aboard a  cork float approximately one mile from the freighter. Spachidakis immediately summoned Captain Stylianos Coutsodontis to the bridge, and the two gradually realized Spachidakis's sighting was not a fishing vessel, but a small, oblong white raft carrying a young blonde-haired child dressed in a white cotton blouse and pink corduroy slacks, leaning backward and waving feebly. The captain ordered the freighter's engines stopped and a life raft lowered. Noting sharks circling close to the cork float, crew members shouted at the child not to jump into the water while one crew member, Evangelos Kantzilas, lifted the child aboard the raft. She was then hoisted aboard the Captain Theo and placed in a spare cabin.

Aboard the freighter, the crew rapidly discovered the child was incoherent and barely able to speak. She was given water and orange juice as salt was sponged from her body with wet towels and Vaseline applied to her lips. She hoarsely identified herself as 11-year-old Terry Jo Duperrault; informing the crew that she had been floating aboard the cork float for several days after the sinking of her vessel. Her ability to speak rapidly waned, and the child soon responded to questions by weakly gesticulating, before lapsing into a semi-comatose state.

The crew of the Captain Theo did not retrieve the cork float upon which Terry Jo had drifted for almost four days. However, a member of the coast guard did locate and retrieve the raft from the ocean several days later. The raft had almost fallen apart and almost immediately began to disintegrate in the hands of this individual.

Recuperation
The captain of the Captain Theo immediately informed the United States Coast Guard of their discovery and the child's medical predicament, and a rescue helicopter was soon summoned. Terry Jo—suffering from severe sunburn, dehydration, and exposure—was airlifted to hospital in a critical condition.

Three hours later, having been airlifted to a Miami hospital, Terry Jo began to slowly recuperate, although for over two days she was unable to divulge to police or the Coast Guard the circumstances surrounding her rescue and the truth of what had actually happened to her family and Mary Dene Harvey.

Terry Jo's statement
By November 20, Terry Jo had regained sufficient strength to reveal to investigators the truth about the loss of the Bluebelle and its passengers.

Late on November 12, the Bluebelle began its return journey to Fort Lauderdale. At around 9 p.m., Terry Jo had entered the lower cabin to sleep, leaving her parents, siblings, Harvey, and his wife on deck. Later that evening, she was awakened by the sounds of her brother screaming and calling for his father, and heavy footfalls, which she decided to investigate. Above deck, she observed the bodies of her brother and mother in the main cabin, not far from the galley.

Walking further onto the deck, Terry Jo then observed Harvey carrying a bucket. He had simply struck her, then shoved her below deck, shouting, "Get back down there!" The terrified child returned to her cabin only to observe oil and water beginning to gush onto the floor of her cabin approximately 15 minutes later. Harvey then entered her cabin with what appeared to be a rifle in his right hand. The two made eye contact, but Harvey did not shoot her—simply returning above deck. Terry Jo then heard hammering sounds.

Shortly thereafter, Terry Jo returned to the deck, only to observe Harvey standing on the deck and the vessel's dinghy floating on the port side. He then asked the child, "Is the dinghy loose?", to which she replied she did not know. Harvey then ordered her to hold a rope attached to the dinghy while he retrieved something. By the time Harvey returned to the child, the rope had slipped through her fingers. In response, Harvey dove overboard and swam toward the dinghy, abandoning Terry Jo on the sinking vessel.

Recollecting the small oblong cork float lashed to the deck, Terry Jo untied this float as the boat deck began to sink beneath the ocean. She then threw the float "over the side" of the deck before swimming toward the life raft, pushing the float further into the open water before climbing onto the float. She had then drifted upon the sea for almost three and a half days without food, water, or shelter. Her life raft had been so small Terry Jo had to sit upright for the entire ordeal, during which she had repeatedly prayed for rescue.

Terry Jo was adamant that the mast of the Bluebelle was intact, that there had been no fire aboard the vessel, and that the sea was calm throughout the entirety of the events prior to the sinking. Shortly thereafter, she was informed that Harvey had been picked up alive three days prior to herself in a life raft, alongside her sister's dead body, and that the bodies of her parents, her brother, and Harvey's wife had all been lost at sea.

November 16 inquiry
On November 16, Harvey reiterated his story to the U.S. Coast Guard investigators that a sudden squall had brought down the Bluebelles masts, holing the ship's hull, rupturing the auxiliary gas tank, and starting a fire, the circumstances of which made it impossible for him to rescue his wife or any member of the Duperrault family. Harvey also claimed he had found René's body floating in the water and that he had tried unsuccessfully to revive the child.

Harvey's suicide
On November 17, midway through Harvey's scheduled interrogation, he was informed that Terry Jo had been rescued the previous day, and that her condition was improving. His response was to exclaim, "Oh my God!", before quickly and calmly adding, "Isn't that wonderful?" A lieutenant Ernest Murdoch then informed Harvey that an official investigation into the loss of the Bluebelle and her passengers was to be launched that day. Shortly thereafter, he asked to be excused from further interrogation, claiming he was tired and that he wished to speak with his wife's family. His request was granted.

Harvey then drove a short distance toward Biscayne Boulevard, where he checked into the Sandman Motel under the assumed name of John Monroe, paying cash for a room. He then penned a two-page suicide note before committing suicide by slashing his thigh, ankles, and jugular vein with a razor blade in the motel bathroom. His body was found by a maid approximately two hours later. The suicide note—addressed to a close friend from his days of military service—was found on a dresser within the room adjacent to his body. This note left no explanations or apologies for his actions, but simply ended with the words: "I got too tired and nervous. I couldn't stand it any longer." The note also requested the recipient take care of his fourteen-year-old son, Lance, and that he be buried at sea.

Inquiry conclusion

Given such clear evidence of foul play from the sole survivor of the Bluebelle and Harvey's subsequent suicide, an investigation was launched into Harvey's recent history. This inquiry revealed Harvey, a decorated World War II veteran and Korean War pilot, had difficulty holding a job for any length of time, had serious financial problems, and had recently arranged a double indemnity insurance policy on the life of his wife just two months after their July 1961 marriage. Furthermore, just one month prior to the Duperrault family chartering the Bluebelle, Harvey had been hired by the vessel's owner, businessman Harold Pegg, to take any tourists to sea upon their desired cruises in exchange for $300 a month and free accommodation aboard the ketch. This agreement may have formulated Harvey's plan to murder his wife at sea and then claim that she had vanished, with tourists viewed in his mind as valuable witnesses to corroborate his claims. The Harveys' first chartered clients were the Duperrault family.

The conclusion of the inquiry was that Harvey had planned to kill his wife to collect on her $20,000 double indemnity insurance policy, which would yield double the insured sum if she died accidentally. However, Harvey may have been observed by Arthur Duperrault either in the act of the murder of his wife or the disposal of her body. Harvey had then proceeded to kill Duperrault, his wife, and two of his children, who may also have witnessed his murder. Furthermore, he had likely retrieved René's body from the ocean to add credibility to his story.

In closure, the inquiry concluded that, had Harvey not committed suicide, he would have been prosecuted for the murder of all those who had died aboard the Bluebelle, and the attempted murder of Terry Jo.

Previous insurance fraud
Searching further into Harvey's background, investigators discovered he had previously survived a 1949 car accident that had killed the second of his previous five wives and her mother, when a 1946 Plymouth De Luxe he had been driving plunged off a bridge at high speed into a bayou on a rainy night and in which he had swum to safety, leaving his wife, Joann, and her mother, Myrtle Boylen, to drown. One of his yawls, the Torbatross, had also previously sunk after running into the submerged wreckage of the warship San Marcos, which had sunk in 1911 in shallow water within Chesapeake Bay. Crew members onboard had repeatedly warned Harvey to steer his yawl clear of the wreckage, but he had repeatedly navigated his vessel around the prohibited site, claiming to his cruise passengers to be attempting to read an inscription upon a buoy marking the site. His powerboat, the Valiant, had also sunk under suspicious circumstances off the coast of Cuba in 1958. All these losses and tragedies had yielded large insurance settlements from which he had financially benefitted.

Aftermath
Following the loss of her family, Terry Jo returned to Green Bay to live with her father's sister, her grandmother, and three cousins in the city of De Pere. She refused to part with the blouse and slacks she was wearing at the time of her rescue. The following year, she changed her first name to Tere—in part due to her refusal to be viewed as a victim. Due to contemporary psychological coping strategies in the early 1960s, authority figures very seldom spoke with Terry Jo about her ordeal, and she received no trauma counseling. Consequently, she did not speak publicly about the loss of her family and her survival ordeal for over twenty years.

Tere Jo later married and bore three children. As an adult, she chose to live and work close to the ocean. She is now retired and resides in Kewaunee, Wisconsin.

In 2010, Tere Jo Duperrault Fassbender released her memoir Alone: Orphaned on the Ocean. Co-authored with psychologist and survival expert Richard Logan, this book details her family's final cruise, Harvey's murder of her family and his wife, the three-and-a-half days she spent drifting upon the cork float prior to her rescue, and her life in the years since.

Some individuals, including writer Erle Stanley Gardner, have speculated as to why Harvey did not actually murder Terry Jo upon the Bluebelle. Gardner has speculated Harvey may have actually subconsciously wanted to be caught and punished for his actions. However, Logan and others have theorized that Harvey had actually intended to kill her, but when Terry Jo accidentally dropped the rope connected to his dinghy, he was forced to dive overboard in order to prevent its floating away without him, and thus left her alive on the sinking ship, believing she would not survive.

Forty-nine years after her ordeal, Tere Jo granted a televised interview with  morning television show host Matt Lauer, in which she stated: "I think he probably thought I would go down with the ship." She also stated her belief Harvey had originally intended to discreetly murder his wife and dispose of her body, later to claim she was lost at sea, but that his wife likely fought her husband, attracting the attention of her family. Tere Jo has also stated she does not wish for people to reflect upon her ordeal and opine, "Gee, that poor little girl", but rather to think to themselves, "She has gone on with her life." Tere Jo has also stated she has "always believed I was saved for a reason ... if one person heals from a life tragedy [after reading my story], my journey will have been worth it."

Media

Literature

Television
 Tere Jo Duperrault has appeared on a September 1988 episode of the American talk show The Oprah Winfrey Show. On this episode, she was reunited with Stylianos Coutsodontis, the captain of the Greek freighter who had rescued her.
 The morning television show Today aired an interview with Tere Jo Duperrault in 2010. In this interview, she discussed her survival ordeal and her theory as to why Harvey did not murder her before abandoning her on the sinking vessel. This episode aired on May 6, 2010.

See also

 Double indemnity
 Insurance fraud
 Mass murder
 Survivor guilt

Notes

References

Cited works and further reading

External links
 November 27, 1961 Desert Sun news article focusing on Harvey's accounts of the sinking of the Bluebelle
 Orphaned on the Ocean: The Unbelievable Story of Terry Jo Duperrault: A 2016 Reader's Digest article focusing upon the Duperrault murders
 2021 account of the scuttling of the Bluebelle at historyofyesterday.com

Child murder
Formerly missing people
Incidents of violence against girls
Individual sailing vessels
Missing person cases in The Bahamas
Murderers for life insurance money
People lost at sea
Scuttled vessels
Ships built in Sturgeon Bay, Wisconsin
Shipwrecks in the Atlantic Ocean
1928 ships
1960s missing person cases
1961 in the United States
1961 murders in the United States
Maritime incidents in 1961
Mass murder in 1961
November 1961 events